Hansaplatz  is a Berlin U-Bahn station located on the  in the Hansaviertel district. It opened on 28 August 1961 with the first section of the new line running south–north from Spichernstraße to Leopoldplatz. The station itself had been erected as early as 1957 in the course of the Interbau housing development.

Right besides the U-bahn train station is Hansaplatz square. Now a non-discernible traffic junction, this was an active plaza before the war. Led by Kolleg X students from the Bauhaus in Dessau, there is an active movement to reclaim this Plaza as a community space and share it with the cars and bicycles that currently dominate.

References

U9 (Berlin U-Bahn) stations
Buildings and structures in Mitte
Railway stations in Germany opened in 1961